The AN/SPS-55 is a solid state surface search and navigation radar. It was developed by Cardion Electronics for the U.S. Navy under a contract awarded in 1971. It was originally developed for a class of ships known as Patrol Frigates, but it was also installed on numerous Cruisers, Destroyers, and Minesweepers. It is an I band radar and its antenna consists of two waveguide slotted arrays mounted back-to-back. One array provides linear polarisation and the other provides circular polarisation. Polarisation is user selectable and the circular polarised array is more effective in reducing returns from precipitation.

Features
 Magnetron transmitter
 Low noise RF receiver
 Sensitivity time control
 Fast time constant filtering
 Sector radiate

The effective range of the radar is from 50 feet to beyond 50 miles. It is primarily used to detect other ships, coastlines and navigation hazards.

The "Sensitivity Time Control" automatically adjusts the gain of the RF receiver from low to high based on the time elapsed from the last transmitter pulse. This helps to adjust for the fact that nearby targets generate a larger return than distant targets of the same size.

The "Fast Time Constant Filtering" helps to remove targets which have a very large range size, like clouds, while passing targets with a smaller range size, like ships or aircraft.

The "Sector Radiate" allows the operator to turn off the transmitter for any sized pie shaped sector of the antenna's 360 degree rotation. An operator might want to do this to avoid detection by an enemy receiver which lies within a known or suspected location.

The installation of Field Change 13 disabled the antenna's circular polarisation feature. Field Change 13 was necessary to address reliability issues associated with the replacement version of the waveguide switch used for polarisation selection.

Platforms
: AN/SPS-73 has replaced the AN/SPS-55

See also
Electronics Technician

References

External links
GlobalSecurity.org - AN/SPS-55
FAS.org - AN/SPS-55
GlobalSecurity.org: CG-47 Ticonderoga-class
Electronics Technician Vol 7 - AN/SPS-55
NAVAIR warfighters encyclopedia - AN/SPS-55

Sea radars
Military electronics of the United States